The canton of Collonges is a former administrative division in eastern France. It was disbanded following the French canton reorganisation which came into effect in March 2015. It had 11,647 inhabitants (2012).

The canton comprised 10 communes:

Challex
Chézery-Forens
Collonges
Confort
Farges
Lancrans
Léaz
Péron
Pougny
Saint-Jean-de-Gonville

Demographics

See also
Cantons of the Ain department 
Communes of France

References

Former cantons of Ain
2015 disestablishments in France
States and territories disestablished in 2015